The tamalito or "tamalitos" is a common dish prepared by the Maya (Belize). The appearance of the "tamalitos" is of the tamales which is wrapped with leaves but without meat.

Preparation
Tamalitos is prepared by using fresh corn "maiz" preferably the ones which have been harvested one or two days ago. The fresher the corn the sweeter and softer the tamalito. Twenty fresh corns caters for fifteen tamalitos.

See also
 List of dumplings

References

Peruvian cuisine
Culture of Amazonas Region
Dumplings